Birandra is a genus of beetles in the family Cerambycidae, containing the following species:

 Birandra angulicollis (Bates, 1879)
 Birandra antioquensis (Cardona-Duque, Santos-Silva & Wolff, 2007)
 Birandra boucheri Santos-Silva & Lezama, 2010
 Birandra cribrata (Thomson, 1861)
 Birandra cubaecola (Chevrolat, 1862)
 Birandra lata (Bates, 1884)
 Birandra latreillei Santos-Silva & Shute, 2009
 Birandra lucanoides (Thomson, 1861)
 Birandra mariahelenae (Santos-Silva, 2002)
 Birandra pinchoni (Villiers, 1979)
 Birandra punctata (White, 1853)
 Birandra silvaini (Tavakilian, 2000)
 Birandra tavakiliani (Santos-Silva, 2002)

References

Parandrinae